The European Administrative School (EAS), also known as the European School of Administration, is an EU body founded in 2005 to provide specialist training to staff from all institutions of the European Union. It is part of the European Personnel Selection Office.

Unlike other similar schools, the EAS offers training to staff after recruitment, rather than training potential future staff. It also conducts training of staff who are being considered for promotion, and for some staff who are already working as administrative personnel.

The School has been described by a French government report as an "interesting model" for a "more open" scheme of training.

References

External links
EAS website

Non-institutional bodies of the European Union
2005 establishments in the European Union